David Sousa may refer to:

 David Sousa (footballer, born 1980), Spanish football midfielder
 David Sousa (footballer, born 2001), Brazilian football defender